Slaves of Pride is a 1920 American silent drama film directed by George Terwilliger and starring Alice Joyce, Percy Marmont and Gustav von Seyffertitz.

Cast
 Alice Joyce as Patricia Leeds
 Percy Marmont as Brewster Howard
 Templar Saxe as Captain Apple 
 Louise Beaudet as Mrs. Leeds
 Gustav von Seyffertitz as John Reynolds
 Charles A. Stevenson as Jason Leeds

References

Bibliography
 Langman, Larry. American Film Cycles: The Silent Era. Greenwood Publishing, 1998.

External links
 

1920 films
1920 drama films
1920s English-language films
American silent feature films
Silent American drama films
American black-and-white films
Films directed by George Terwilliger
Vitagraph Studios films
1920s American films